The North Carolina Tar Heels football team represents the University of North Carolina at Chapel Hill in the sport of American football  or Gridiron Football. The Tar Heels play in the Football Bowl Subdivision (FBS) of the National Collegiate Athletic Association (NCAA) and the Coastal Division of the Atlantic Coast Conference (ACC).

North Carolina has played in 37 bowl games in its history and won three Southern Conference championships and five Atlantic Coast Conference titles. Thirty Tar Heel players have been honored as first-team All-Americas on 38 occasions. Carolina had 32 All-Southern Conference selections when it played in that league until 1952 and since joining the ACC in 1953, has had 174 first-team All-ACC choices. Since joining the Atlantic Coast Conference in 1953, the team has won five conference championships, with the most recent title coming in 1980.

One very important contribution to the game of football by Carolina is the modern use of the forward pass; they were the first college team to use the play in 1895. Bob Quincy notes in his 1973 book They Made the Bell Tower Chime John Heisman, a noted historian, wrote 30 years later that, indeed, the Tar Heels had given birth to the forward pass against the Bulldogs (UGA). It was conceived to break a scoreless deadlock and give UNC a 6–0 win. The Tar Heels were in a punting situation and a Georgia rush seemed destined to block the ball. The punter, with an impromptu dash to his right, tossed the ball and it was caught by George Stephens, who ran 70 yards for a touchdown."

The program has long been overshadowed by the school's powerhouse men's basketball team and the  "academic-athletic" scandal in which paper classes yielded inflated grades to maintain athlete eligibility. While not a consistent football powerhouse, the Carolina football program has had intermittent success and has featured a number of players who have gone on to play in the National Football League, including Lawrence Taylor, Charlie Justice, Chris Hanburger, Ken Willard, Don McCauley, William Fuller, Harris Barton, Jeff Saturday, Alge Crumpler, Willie Parker, Greg Ellis, Dré Bly, Julius Peppers, Hakeem Nicks, T.J. Yates, 
Mitch Trubisky, and Sam Howell.

History

Early history (1888–1958)

The University of North Carolina fielded its first football team in 1888. The Tar Heels played four games with a final record of 1–3. The team captains for the 1888 season were Bob Bingham and Steve Bragaw. The game against Wake Forest was the first in the state, and the first against Trinity the first "scientific" game in the state. Ergo, one or the other is the first intercollegiate game in North Carolina. Between the first two games played in 1888 and next two games played in 1889 Princeton star Hector Cowan traveled south and trained the team. At the beginning of 1889, UNC played two games with a final record of 1–1. The team captains for the 1889 season were Lacy Little and Steve Bragaw.

William A. Reynolds coached the Tar Heels for four seasons. In 1897, Carolina played ten games with a final record of 7–3. The team captain for the 1897 season was Arthur Belden. In 1898, the Tar Heels played nine games with a final record of 9–0. The team captain for the 1898 season was Frank O. Rogers. The team claimed a Southern championship. The season opened with an 18–0 defeat of the Guilford Quakers. Charles Baskerville was umpire. The starting lineup was Tate (left end), Shull (left tackle), Miller (left guard), Cunningham (center), Cromartie (right guard), Bennett (Right tackle), Klotz (right end), Rogers (quarterback), Howell (left halfback), Gregory (right halfback), Graves (fullback). In the second week of play, the Tar Heels defeated the in-state rival North Carolina A&M 34–0. Against the Greensboro Athletic Association, UNC won 11–0 which was followed by a victory over Oak Ridge by a score of 11–0. Touchdowns were made by Bennett, Gregory, Copeland, Shull, and Howell in a 28–6 win over V. P. I.

After beating Davidson 11–0, UNC traveled to Macon, Georgia to take on Georgia. the Tar Heels blew out the Georgia Bulldogs 53–0. Tick Tichenor wrote "Such a crush defeat as Georgia sustained at the hands of North Carolina today is almost unparalleled in football". The starting lineup was Klotz (left end), Shull (left tackle), Cromartie (left guard), Cunningham (center), Phifer (right guard), Bennett (Right tackle), Gregoy (right end), Rodgers (quarterback), Austin (left halfback), McRae (right halfback), Graves (fullback). After defeating John Heisman's Auburn Tigers 29–0, UNC beat rival Virginia 6–2, its first win since the first year of the South's Oldest Rivalry. The safety was made just as time called, and Howell scored for UNC. In 1899, UNC played eleven games with a final record of 7–3–1. The team captain for the 1899 season was Samuel Shull. In 1900, Carolina played eight games with a final record of 4–1–3. The team captain for the 1900 season was Frank M. Osborne. From 1897 to 1900, Reynolds posted a 27–7–4 record before departing the Tar Heels to coach Georgia.

Herman Olcott was the head coach for the Tar Heels for two seasons, 1902 and 1903. He compiled an 11–4–3 record. In 1895 and from 1913 to 1915, the Tar Heels were coached by Thomas Trenchard, who posted a 26–9–2 record in those four seasons. His best season was a 10–1 1914 season. Brothers Bob and Bill Fetzer served as co-head coaches for the Tar Heels from 1921 to 1925, posting a 30–12–4 overall record. Bob would go on to serve as Carolina's first athletics director from 1923 to 1952. Chuck Collins served as head coach for the Tar Heels for eight seasons, the longest of any coach to that time in Tar Heel history. His record in Chapel Hill was 38–31–9, his best season being a 9–1 record in 1929, during which Carolina defeated Wake Forest, Maryland, Georgia Tech, VPI, NC State, South Carolina, Davidson, Virginia and Duke.

Carl Snavely, nicknamed "The Grey Fox" for his grey suits he would wear on game day, served two stints as the Tar Heels head football coach. He first came to Chapel Hill from Bucknell. He departed after the 1935 season to accept the head football coach position at Cornell but returned in 1945. Snavely then departed again after the 1952 season to accept the head football coach position at Washington University.  His final record at UNC was 59–35–5 and he was inducted into the College Football Hall of Fame as a coach in 1965. A proponent of the single wing offense, Snavely's teams were known as some of the quickest in the south. His 1946 and 1948 teams reached the Sugar Bowl but lost, finishing ranked No. 9 and No. 3, respectively. Those teams posted 8–2–1 and 9–1 records, respectively. Snavely's 1949 team finished 7–4, lost the Cotton Bowl and ranked No. 16 in the final polls.

Raymond Wolf came to Carolina from his post as TCU defensive line coach. In 1936, the Tar Heels finished with an 8–2 record. Wolf's 1937 Tar Heels finished 7–1–1. The next year saw UNC finish 6–2–1. The Tar Heels would enjoy their best season under Wolf's tutelage in 1939, finishing 8–1–1. In 1940, the Tar Heels finished 6–4. The 1941 season saw Carolina finish 3–7, which would result in Wolf's dismissal. Wolf's overall record in the six seasons he was head coach was 38–17–3, with most of his success coming with players that Snavely recruited.

Jim Tatum served two stints as head football coach at his alma mater. He enlisted in the Navy for World War II and left the team but returned in 1956. His overall record at UNC is 19–17–3. George T. Barclay, another UNC alum, was promoted from assistant coach to head coach following Snavely's second departure. Barclay struggled as UNC's head football coach, posting an 11–18–1 record in his three seasons before resigning. The most notable part of Barclay's tenure is that the Tar Heels helped charter the Atlantic Coast Conference in all sports in 1953. Tatum was inducted into the College Football Hall of Fame as a coach in 1984, primarily for his tenure as head football coach at Maryland. Tatum died unexpectedly in the summer of 1958 from a rickettsial disease.

Jim Hickey era (1959–1966)
Jim Hickey was promoted from assistant coach to head coach after Tatum's death. In Hickey's first season, the Tar Heels finished with a 5–5 record. The season began with a close loss to No. 18 Clemson and another loss to Notre Dame before Carolina defeated NC State and No. 19 South Carolina. After a loss to Maryland and Wake Forest, the Tar Heels lost to No. 20 Tennessee by a score of 29–7. Carolina then lost to Miami before shutting out both Virginia and Duke. In 1960, Carolina finished 3–7. The Tar Heels defeated Notre Dame, No. 6 Duke and Virginia and lost to NC State, Miami, Wake Forest, South Carolina, No. 11 Tennessee, Clemson and Maryland. Hickey's third season saw Carolina improve to 5–5. That year, Carolina faced two ranked teams, defeating No. 10 Maryland and losing to No. 4 LSU. In 1962, the Tar Heels finished 3–7.

Hickey's best season was a 9–2 1963 season in which the Tar Heels won the 1963 Gator Bowl and finished the season ranked No. 19 in the Coaches' Poll. They began the season with an 11–7 win over rival Virginia on September 21. After losing a shutout to Michigan State by a score of 31–0, Carolina won their next five; defeating Wake Forest in a shutout 21–0, Maryland 14–7, NC State by a score of 31–10, South Carolina in a shutout by a score of 7-0 and Georgia by a score of 28–7. After their five-game winning streak was snapped on November 9 with an 11–7 loss to Clemson, the Tar Heels closed the season with three straight wins, defeating Miami by a score of 27–16, archrival Duke by a score of 16-14 and Air Force in the 1963 Gator Bowl in a shutout, prevailing 35–0. In 1964, Carolina slipped to 5–5, which was followed by a 4–6 campaign in 1965 and a campaign in 1966. Hickey left UNC to accept the position of athletics director at the University of Connecticut after the 1966 season. He spent eight seasons as the Tar Heels head football coach and compiled a 36–45 record during his time in Chapel Hill.

Bill Dooley era (1967–1977)
Bill Dooley, brother of former Georgia head football coach Vince Dooley and uncle of former Louisiana Tech and Tennessee head football coach Derek Dooley, came to North Carolina from his post as an assistant coach at Georgia. Dooley enjoyed success at UNC, compiling a 69–53–2 record in 11 seasons. Six of those seasons were bowl appearances, five losses and one win.

In 1967, the Tar Heels struggled to a 2–8 record, with wins over Maryland and Duke. In 1968, Carolina showed a little improvement, finishing 3–7 with wins over Vanderbilt, No 7 Florida and Duke. In 1969, Carolina finished 5–5, their best season in five years.

Dooley's 1970 team went 8–4, finishing with a Peach Bowl loss to Arizona State. The next season, 1971, was a 9–3 season that was capped with a Gator Bowl loss to Georgia and a No. 18 ranking in the Coaches' Poll. Dooley became the first Tar Heels coach to win 11 games in a single season in 1972, going 11–1 with a victory over Texas Tech in the Sun Bowl, and rankings of No. 14 and No. 12 in the Coaches' and AP Polls. In 1973, Dooley's Tar Heels finished 4–7 with wins over William & Mary, Kentucky and Wake Forest. The 1974 Tar Heels finished 7–5 and lost to Mississippi State in the Sun Bowl. In 1975, North Carolina finished 3–7–1.

Dooley's 1976 team finished 9–3 with a loss to Kentucky in the Peach Bowl and the 1977 team finished 8–3–1 with a loss to Nebraska in the Liberty Bowl. Those teams finished with rankings of No. 14 and No. 17 in the Coaches' and AP Polls, respectively. Dooley departed after the 1977 season to accept a unique opportunity as both the athletics director and head football coach at Virginia Tech. Dooley was the winningest head coach in Carolina football history until he was surpassed by Dick Crum in 1987.

Dick Crum era (1978–1987)

Dick Crum was hired away from Miami (OH) to replace Dooley. Crum brought with him a tough, rigid philosophy of an aggressive offense powered by a strong running game and a defensive scheme that emphasized ball control and fundamentals.

In his first season, Crum led the 1978 Tar Heels to a 5–6 record, which included losses to No. 18 Maryland, No. 9 Pittsburgh and No. 15 Clemson. In 1979, the Tar Heels finished 8–3–1 with a win over Michigan in the Gator Bowl to finish the season. Crum enjoyed his best season at Carolina in 1980, leading the Heels to a record of 11–1, a Bluebonnet Bowl win over Texas and an ACC Championship, Carolina's last to date.

In 1981, the Heels compiled a 10–2 record and finished the season by beating Arkansas in the Gator Bowl. That would be Carolina's last season of double digit wins for 13 years. The next two seasons saw Carolina finish 8–4. After the 1982 season, Carolina upset Texas in the Sun Bowl. The 1979-1982 Carolina teams were the first in the ACC to go to 4 consecutive bowl games, winning all 4. In 1983, they would lose to Florida State in the Peach Bowl.

In 1984, Carolina would finish 5–5–1. They would post another five-win campaign the next year, along with six losses. Carolina would go 7–4–1 with an Aloha Bowl loss to Arizona to end the season in 1986, but Carolina would finish 5–6 in 1987, increasing the unhappiness fans and administration had slowly built over the past few years of mediocrity and inconsistency.

Crum resigned under pressure as Tar Heels head coach after ten seasons. Crum led the Tar Heels to four bowl victories in six bowl appearances. Crum departed as the winningest head coach in Carolina football history, with a 72–41–3 record. Notable players coached by Crum at UNC include Lawrence Taylor, Harris Barton, Kelvin Bryant, Amos Lawrence, Donnell Thompson, Darrell Nicholson, Buddy Curry, Steve Streater, and Reuben Davis.

Mack Brown's first tenure (1988–1997)
Mack Brown was hired away from Tulane as Crum's replacement. He was the Tar Heel head coach for ten seasons. Brown's first two teams finished with identical 1–10 records, the worst two seasons that the Tar Heels have suffered on the field in modern times. However, the next two years saw a relatively quick return to respectability. In 1990, the Tar Heels finished 6–4–1. By comparison, the Tar Heels had won only seven games in the previous three years. Included in the 1990 total was a tie of Georgia Tech that proved to be the Yellow Jackets' only non-win that season en route to a share of the national championship. In 1991, the Tar Heels finished 7–4, narrowly missing a bowl bid.

Everything came together for the Tar Heels in 1992. They finished 8–3 in the regular season, good enough for second in the Atlantic Coast Conference, and capped the season with a victory over Mississippi State in the Peach Bowl, they finished the season at 9–3. The Peach Bowl was the program's first bowl appearance since 1986, first bowl win since 1982, and first appearance in a final Top 25 poll since 1982. That season was the start of UNC's most successful period since the Charlie Justice era in the late 1940s. Brown coached the Tar Heels to five consecutive bowl games, including UNC's only two New Year's Day bowl games in more than half a century (or three, if one counts the 1992–93 Peach Bowl, which was played the day after New Year's to avoid a conflict with the Sugar Bowl). The Tar Heels were ranked in the AP Top 25 every week from October 1992 through the start of the 1995 season. They finished in the final rankings in four out of five years, including two straight appearances in the top 10. Carolina won 10 regular-season games in 1993, only the third time the Tar Heels accomplished the feat, with the only losses coming to No. 1 Florida State, No. 21 Virginia in the regular season and No. 18 Alabama in the Gator Bowl.

In 1994, Brown led the Tar Heels to an 8–4 record with a loss to Texas in the Sun Bowl to cap the year. UNC lost to No. 3 Florida State, No. 25 Virginia, and No. 24 Clemson. Brown's seventh season in 1995 saw the Tar Heels finish 7–5 with a victory over Arkansas in the Carquest Bowl to finish the season. In 1996 and 1997, the Tar Heels finished with 10 and 11 wins, respectively. Brown would leave North Carolina in 1997 for the head coaching position at Texas. Largely due to Florida State joining the league in 1992 and their dominance over the college landscape in the 1990's, Brown was unable to win an ACC title in his first tenure despite leading the team during one of its most prolonged stretches of football success. 

Brown's tenure was also known for the rise in popularity in the Tar Heel football program that, while respectable in its own right, was overshadowed by the Tar Heel's national powerhouse men's basketball program. Games at Kenan Memorial Stadium were almost always sold out, highlighted by the 62,000 that showed to watch the Tar Heels' "Judgement Day" game against Florida State in 1997, the largest crowd at a regular season college football game in the history of the state of North Carolina. Brown also led an effort that resulted in the upgrading of UNC's football facilities and the expansion of Kenan Memorial Stadium. Notable players who played for Brown in his first stint at North Carolina include Jeff Saturday, Greg Ellis and Dré Bly.

Carl Torbush era (1998–2000)
Carl Torbush was promoted from defensive coordinator to head coach of the UNC Tar Heels football program following Brown's departure. Torbush's hiring was praised by many UNC fans and alums, who felt Torbush's performance as defensive coordinator was superb and that an in-program hire was the best way to maintain the momentum generated by Mack Brown.

Despite the loss of most of the team's defensive stars of the last three years, the Tar Heels were expected to pick up right where they left off in 1998. However, they never really recovered from an unexpected loss to Miami (Ohio) to open the 1998 season, during which Carolina went 6-5 and barely managed to qualify for a bowl appearance. Torbush led the Tar Heels to the Las Vegas Bowl, where they defeated San Diego State by a score of 20–13. The next year was an unmitigated disaster. The team was riddled with injuries, the most devastating one occurring when quarterback Ronald Curry tore his Achilles tendon. The Tar Heels were so thin at quarterback that they were forced to convert safety Antwon Black to quarterback, but he was lost after two games to mononucleosis. After starting the season 1–1, the Tar Heels didn't win another game until beating North Carolina State in November. They finished 3–8, UNC's first losing season since Mack Brown's two consecutive 1–10 seasons in 1988 and 1989. School officials actually planned to fire him after the season, but an outpouring of support from players and fans led to a change of heart. He was, however, forced to fire several members of his staff, including offensive coordinator Steve Marshall, who had been criticized for being too conservative in his play calling.

The Tar Heels rebounded to finish 6–5 in 2000, but it wasn't enough to save Torbush's job; he was fired at the end of the season. Torbush left Carolina with a record of 17–18. Notable players who played for Torbush at UNC are Julius Peppers, Alge Crumpler and Jeff Reed.

John Bunting era (2001–2006)
John Bunting was hired by his alma mater as the Tar Heels head coach after the firing of Torbush despite no FBS coaching experience of any kind, assistant coaching or head coaching.

In his first season, Bunting led the Tar Heels to an 8–5 record, which included a win over Florida State 41–9. It was the Tar Heels' first win over a team ranked in the top 10 of a major media poll; the Seminoles were ranked sixth in the AP Poll at the time. They closed the season with a victory over Auburn in the 2001 Peach Bowl. However, his teams since were highly inconsistent. In 2002, Bunting's Tar Heels finished 3–9. That was followed by a 2–10 campaign in 2003. In 2004, the Tar Heels finished 6–6. UNC defeated Miami 31–28 on a last-second field goal by Connor Barth during the 2004 season; the Hurricanes were ranked fourth at the time in the AP poll. The Tar Heels capped the 2004 season with a loss in the Continental Tire Bowl to Boston College by a score of 37–24.

In 2005, North Carolina finished 5–6. The team was routed during the 2005 season 69-14 by Louisville, one of the worst losses in modern Tar Heel history. During his final season (2006), his team had a record of 3–9, while averaging over 23 fewer points per game than their opponents.

Bunting was fired by UNC athletics director Dick Baddour on October 22, 2006. He was allowed to finish out the 2006 season. Bunting's last home victory on November 18, 2006, against NC State, broke a seven-game losing streak, and he was able to close out his career one week later with a 45–44 win over Duke. Bunting compiled an overall record of 27–45 over six seasons.

Butch Davis era (2007–2010)

Former Cleveland Browns and Miami head football coach Butch Davis was hired as the Tar Heels 32nd head football coach in late 2006. Davis was a big-name coach whose hiring was praised nationwide. Davis originally signed a seven-year deal worth approximately $1.86 million per season, with a base salary of $286,000. Additionally, he received $25,000 a year in expenses and a supplement from the Educational Foundation (Ram's Club) that ranged from $1 million in 2007 to $1.3 million in 2013. Davis took over a program that had seen three winning seasons in the past eight years and had won more than six games in a season two other times.

During his first season as head coach, the 2007 Tar Heels finished 4–8, with six of those losses coming by a touchdown or less and two coming against teams ranked in the top 15 at the time. Despite a losing record in 2007, North Carolina fans averaged over 57,000 fans in Kenan Stadium during the season, the highest average attendance since the Mack Brown era. The 2007 match-up against South Carolina saw a crowd of 61,000, the second-largest in school history. During the season, suspicion mounted that Davis would leave UNC after his first year if the head coaching job at his alma mater, Arkansas, opened up. The rumors grew louder when Houston Nutt was forced to resign at Arkansas, but Davis denied he was leaving. On November 21, 2007, Davis agreed to a one-year contract extension, along with a raise of about $291,000 annually. Davis said in a statement that one year at UNC convinced him that this was where he wanted to be, and that he intended to have "a long and successful career in Chapel Hill." Athletics director Dick Baddour said he could not release all the details of the contract until it was approved by the school's board of trustees, but did say the base salary would rise $29,000, the expenses would go up $5,000, and Davis’ supplemental income would go up $100,000.

2008 North Carolina Tar Heels football team were expected to be much improved from the previous year, with most outlets picking them to finish second in the Coastal Division.  In their second game of the season they routed the Rutgers Scarlet Knights on the road 44–12.  This was their first victory outside the state of North Carolina since 2002.  On October 4, the Heels defeated the then 24th-ranked Connecticut Huskies 38–12 for their first victory over a ranked non-conference opponent in 11 years. As a result, the Tar Heels were ranked 22nd in the weekly Associated Press rankings, their first appearance in a major poll in seven years. The following Saturday, the Tar Heels defeated the Notre Dame Fighting Irish, their first regular-season win as a ranked team in 11 years. A crowd of 60,500, third-largest in school history, watched the Tar Heels play the Fighting Irish. A 16–13 overtime loss at Virginia on October 18 briefly knocked the Heels out of the rankings, but after a 45–24 victory over Boston College on October 25, the team became bowl-eligible for the first time since 2004. The win also resulted in the team being ranked in the Bowl Championship Series rankings for the first time since the BCS began in 1998.  A week later, they defeated Georgia Tech to clinch their first winning season since 2001, and only their fourth since Brown left the school after the 1997 season. The Tar Heels lost three of their last four games, including a loss in the Meineke Car Care Bowl to West Virginia.

Davis led the 2009 Tar Heels to another 8–4 regular season record and a second straight bowl appearance, the first time since the 1997–1998 seasons that UNC had made consecutive bowl appearances. A loss to North Carolina State in the final game of the season sent them back to the Meineke Car Care Bowl. UNC faced the Pittsburgh Panthers on December 26, 2009, and lost for the second straight year, giving UNC another 8–5 final record. Additionally, Davis led Carolina football to its 6th consecutive year of graduating more than 75% of its football players. The America Football Coaches Association recognized fewer than 30 public universities for superior graduation rates that year, with UNC the only such institution in the state of North Carolina and the Atlantic Coast Conference.

In July 2010, the NCAA began investigating violations involving improper benefits provided by agents to current players at UNC.  In September 2010, the NCAA opened a second prong of its investigation, this time involving possible improper tutor involvement with UNC student-athletes.  In response to the investigation, local and national sports columnists called for Davis' termination, but some North Carolina fans still supported the coach. A survey of UNC fans reflected strong support for Coach Davis despite the ongoing investigation.

Thirteen UNC football players were suspended for the team's season opener in Atlanta against LSU, and the Tar Heels lost the game 30–24. The Tar Heels later lost to ACC rivals Miami, Georgia Tech, Virginia Tech, and NC State, but won their first game since 1981 in Virginia's Scott Stadium and gained their first win ever in FSU's Doak Campbell Stadium. In October 2010, wide receiver Greg Little, defensive tackle Marvin Austin, and defensive end Robert Quinn were ruled permanently ineligible after it was discovered they improperly accepted gifts from sports agents. Five other players were found guilty of accepting improper benefits and/or inappropriate academic assistance.

On July 27, 2011, Davis was fired by UNC chancellor Holden Thorp amid an NCAA investigation of academic misconduct and allegations players receiving improper benefits from agents. Davis left Carolina after compiling a 28–23 record. Thorp said the move was necessary to restore confidence in UNC's integrity. On September 19, 2011, in response to an NCAA notice of allegations, Davis was never mentioned in the NCAA inquiry and had no involvement in the investigation. North Carolina subsequently vacated all of its wins from the 2008 and 2009 seasons after retroactively declaring Austin, Quinn and Little ineligible.  As a result, these are "officially" North Carolina's only winless seasons in the modern era.

In 2013, Davis told CBS Sports' Bruce Feldman that he believed his firing was an "overreaction" by Thorp, in the belief that "if he released me, maybe the investigation of the football program would go in a different direction."  Around the same time, Baddour told Feldman that firing Davis "was not my recommendation." Baddour added that Thorp was well aware that he wanted Davis to remain as coach.

NCAA investigation 2010–2011

In July 2010, it was reported that the program was being investigated by the NCAA due to possible connections with sport agents. The football program was also under investigation for academic fraud and a failure to properly monitor players, which the NCAA found to be true. Seven players from the UNC football program, including starters and once top recruits Greg Little and Marvin Austin, were reported to have accepted more than $27,000 in impermissible benefits in 2009 and 2010. Following an NCAA investigation into misconduct, in July 2011, head coach Butch Davis was fired  and replaced by interim coach Everett Withers. Also, in September 2011, the program decided to vacate all its wins from the 2008 and 2009 seasons, reduce its scholarship athletes by 3, begin serving two years of probation, and pay a $50,000 fine. The NCAA later increased the penalties to a reduction of athletic scholarships by 15, three years of probation, and a post-season ban of one year.

Everett Withers (2011)

Everett Withers was promoted from defensive coordinator to 33rd head coach of the Tar Heels football program for the 2011 season following Butch Davis' dismissal. Withers was the first African American head coach in Tar Heels football history.

With Withers leading the Tar Heels, UNC beat their first opponent, FCS school James Madison by a score of 42–10. Bryn Renner set the single game school record for completion percentage at 95.7%. The Heels then beat Rutgers 24–22, holding the Scarlet Knights to one total yard rushing and 244 yards overall. The week after, the South's Oldest Rivalry was resumed, as Carolina beat Virginia by a score of 28–17. UNC rushed for 222 total yards for an average of 5.4 yards per carry. The Heels then traveled to Atlanta to play No. 25 Georgia Tech, dropping this one 35–28. Georgia Tech had 312 yards rushing and 496 yards total on the day. Next the Heels played East Carolina beating them 35–20. The Heels then proceeded to beat the Louisville by a score of 14–7. Giovani Bernard became the first Tar Heel rusher in 27 years to rush for over 100 yards in four straight games. Bernard extended his streak of 100 yard rushing games to five in UNC's 30–24 loss to Miami. The Heels recovered an onside kick with under a minute to go, but time ran out before they could score. The Heels then traveled to Clemson, South Carolina to face the Clemson Tigers, losing 59–38. It was the second most points given up by the Tar Heels in their 405 ACC games, trailing only the 63 given up in a game against Florida State in 2000. The next game was the homecoming game for the Heels, and they beat Wake Forest 49–24. UNC racked up 506 total yards and caught four interceptions in the game. Next up for the Heels was the rivalry game with NC State in Raleigh, which the Heels lost 13–0. It was the Heels fifth straight loss to the Wolfpack, the first shutout in the series since 1960. Giovani Bernard did break the 1,000 yard rushing mark for the season, but as a team the Heels were held to three total yards rushing. On a Thursday night in Blacksburg, Virginia the Heels lost to Virginia Tech 24–21. Dwight Jones passed the 1,000 yard receiving mark for the season, making the 2011 Tar Heels the first team to have a 1,000 yard receiver and rusher in the same season. UNC closed out the regular season with a home win over arch-rival Duke, winning 37–21. Dwight Jones's 79 receptions and Bryn Renner's 23 TD passes set single season records for the Tar Heels.

Withers led the Tar Heels to a 7–6 record in his only season, capped with a loss to Missouri in the Independence Bowl. After Withers was thanked for his good service, he was informed that his contract would not be extended beyond the 2011 season.

Larry Fedora era (2012–2018)

Larry Fedora was hired from Southern Miss in late 2011 as the Tar Heels' 34th head football coach, replacing Withers. In his first year as head coach, in a season that the UNC football team was ineligible for the ACC title (due to sanctions from Davis' tenure), a bowl game and a ranking in the USA Today Coaches' Poll, Fedora led the team to an 8–4 record. North Carolina had at least eight victories in four of the five years from 2008 to 2012. The eight wins in 2008 and 2009 were vacated due to NCAA penalty. The last time North Carolina had more than eight victories was in 1997.

After starting the 2013 season 1–5, Fedora's Tar Heels rebounded to finish 5–1 in their final six regular season games and capped the season with a thrashing of Cincinnati in the Belk Bowl to finish the season with a 7–6 record. After the 2013 season, offensive coordinator Blake Anderson left the Tar Heels to accept the head coaching position at Arkansas State.

The Tar Heels went into the 2014 season with a new offensive coordinator, Seth Littrell. That year, the Tar Heels were never able to achieve much consistency on defense, giving up over 497 yards per game (111th in the nation, and fourth-worst among Power 5 teams) en route to a 6–6 regular season and a 40–21 loss to Rutgers in the 2014 Quick Lane Bowl. In an effort to address this, Fedora fired defensive coordinator Vic Koenning after the season and hired former Iowa State and Auburn head coach Gene Chizik as defensive coordinator.

In 2015, Fedora led the Tar Heels to an 11–1 regular season and the team's first ACC Coastal Division championship. The team also finished with a perfect 8–0 record in conference play and were ranked as high as No. 8 in the AP and Coaches' Polls, their highest ranking since 1997. In the 2015 ACC Championship Game, the Tar Heels lost to Clemson by a score of 45–37, despite a controversial onside kick penalty. The Tar Heels then lost in the Russell Athletic Bowl to Baylor 49–38. The Tar Heels finished the season 11–3 (8–0 ACC) and ranked 15th in the country, marking the team's first postseason Top 25 ranking since 1997. After the 2015 season, offensive coordinator Seth Littrell left Carolina to take the head coaching position at North Texas.

In 2016, Fedora led the Tar Heels to an 8–5 (5–3) record. Carolina began the season with a loss to Georgia in the Chick-fil-A Kickoff Game in Atlanta by a score of 33–24. Carolina then reeled off four straight wins, which included an upset win over No. 12 Florida State in Tallahassee by a score of 37–35 after a game-winning field goal as time expired, snapping the Seminoles' 22-game home winning streak. UNC then suffered an embarrassing home loss to Virginia Tech by a score of 34–3. After losing to NC State in the regular season finale, the Tar Heels, who were led by star quarterback Mitch Trubisky, lost in the Sun Bowl to Stanford by a score of 25–23. Following the 2016 season, defensive coordinator Gene Chizik resigned to spend more time with his family in Auburn, Alabama. Fedora promoted linebackers coach John Papuchis to replace Chizik as defensive coordinator. Fedora's 2017 and 2018 teams struggled mightily. The Tar Heels were unable to find consistent offense, cycling through several starting quarterbacks including LSU transfer Brandon Harris, Chazz Surratt, Nathan Elliott and Cade Fortin. After going 5–18 in those two seasons, Fedora was fired as head coach following the final game of the 2018 season, an overtime loss to rival N.C. State.

Mack Brown's return (2019–present)

Two days after firing coach Fedora, on November 27, 2018, the school announced Mack Brown would be returning as head coach. Brown's return has been highlighted by a significant uptick in the level of recruiting for the Tar Heels, exemplified by the flipping of current Tar Heel star quarterback Sam Howell from Florida State on signing day for the class of 2019. Howell set multiple school records in three seasons as the starting quarterback. But despite Howell's performance and consecutive top-15 recruiting classes (2021 and 2022), the COVID-shortened 8–4 season in 2020 is so far the best record of Brown's second stint.

In Brown's first year coaching since the 2013 season at Texas, the Tar Heels finished 6-6 and became bowl eligible for the first time since the 2016 season, clinching bowl eligibility in the final week of the regular season against rival N.C. State. On October 26, 2019, in a win over Duke, he became the school's all-time wins leader, surpassing his first Tar Heel predecessor, Dick Crum. Brown led the team to their first bowl victory in 6 years, a 55–13 blowout over Temple in the Military Bowl. Under the air-raid system of offensive coordinator Phil Longo, freshman quarterback Sam Howell set the school record for passing touchdowns with 38. Howell's 38 passing scores were also a record for ACC true freshmen, and came two shy of tying Jameis Winston for most touchdown passes by a freshman in conference history. Wide receivers Dazz Newsome and Dyami Brown posted 1,000 yard receiving seasons, and running back Michael Carter rushed for 1,003 yards. His backfield counterpart Javonte Williams had a breakout season, rushing for 933 yards and five touchdowns in 2019. Former quarterback Chazz Surratt made a position change to linebacker after Howell's arrival, and earned first team all-conference honors in his first collegiate season as a linebacker.

The 2020 team finished 8–4 in a season shortened by the COVID-19 pandemic, capped by a 41–27 loss to Texas A&M in the Orange Bowl. This was Carolina's first appearance in a major bowl game since the 1950 Cotton Bowl Classic, and the first ever Orange Bowl berth for the school. Running backs Carter and Williams both rushed for over 1,000 yards in the 2020 season, and wide receiver Dyami Brown posted his second straight 1,000 yard receiving season. Howell set more records in his second season under center, including single game passing touchdowns with six in a come-from-behind victory over Wake Forest. He added a rushing touchdown in the same game, setting the record for total touchdowns in a game with seven. Against Miami in the final week of the regular season, Williams and Carter combined for an FBS 544 rushing yards in the 62–26 blowout of the Hurricanes. Williams' 19 rushing touchdowns on the season tied Don McCauley's single-season record at Carolina.

The 2021 team began the season ranked in the top ten in national preseason polls and was picked to win the ACC Coastal Division, but underperformed and ended the season with a 6–7 record. The Tar Heels finished fifth in the division, capping the season with a disappointing 38–21 loss to South Carolina in the Duke's Mayo Bowl. The 2021 Tar Heel team was one of only two teams in FBS history to have started the season ranked inside the top ten and finish with a losing record.  A bright spot in the 2021 season was the emergence of highly touted wide receiver Josh Downs who set single season program records for receptions and receiving yards, finishing the year with 101 catches for 1,335 yards and 8 touchdowns. Running back Ty Chandler, a graduate transfer from Tennessee rushed for 1,092 yards and 13 touchdowns, making Brown's first three seasons back in Chapel Hill produce at least one 1,000 yard receiver and rusher. Following the conclusion of the season, defensive coordinator Jay Bateman and special teams coordinator Jovan Dewitt were let go, as changes needed to be made to continue the upward trajectory of Carolina football, and the defense and special teams had regressed heavily, despite returning several starters and key rotation pieces. Offensive line coach Stacy Searels, whose unit was another that struggled in 2021, also left the Tar Heels in the offseason to return to Georgia, where he had previously served as OL coach from 2007–2010 under head coach Mark Richt. He was replaced by Jack Bicknell Jr., who had previously worked with Tar Heel OC Phil Longo when both were at Ole Miss under head coach Matt Luke.

The 2022 team entered the season with significant question marks on both sides of the ball, and on special teams. Gene Chizik, Tar Heel defensive coordinator from 2015–16, returned to Chapel Hill to lead the defense after spending five years away from coaching (much like head coach Mack Brown after his departure from Texas in 2013). He brought with him co-DC/defensive backs coach Charlton Warren to rework and improve the Tar Heels' struggling defense. Running backs coach Larry Porter was elevated to Special Teams coordinator, hoping to improve the special teams as well following Dewitt's departure. The Tar Heels brought in graduate transfers Corey Gaynor (Miami) and Spencer Rolland (Harvard) to strengthen their offensive line, and got another in edge rusher Noah Taylor (Virginia) to strengthen the defensive line in Chizik's new scheme. However, the biggest question mark them was who would replace Sam Howell as the Tar Heels' starting quarterback. QB's Jacolby Criswell and Drake Maye spent spring practice and most of training camp in a dead heat battle, which was won by the redshirt freshman Maye. He was announced by the Brown as the team's starting quarterback in Brown's press conference the Monday prior to the Tar Heels' week zero opening game against FAMU. 

In his first start, Maye set multiple records in a 56–24 win. Freshman RB Omarion Hampton ran for over 100 yards against the Rattlers as well, becoming the first Tar Heel running back to achieve that mark in his first career game since legendary Tar Heel Charlie "Choo-Choo" Justice in 1946. Despite rumblings of improvement and progress throughout the offseason, the Tar Heel defense struggled against FAMU and the following week against Appalachian State. Against the Mountaineers, the Tar Heel defense gave up 649 total offensive yards, including 361 passing yards and six touchdown passes for App. quarterback Chase Brice. However, the Tar Heel offense itself gained 567 total offensive yards, the special teams unit returned a Mountaineer onside kick attempt for a touchdown, and the Tar Heels were able to escape Boone with a 63–61 victory in what is considered to be an instant classic. The Tar Heels beat Georgia State the following week to improve to 3–0 on the season for just the third time since 2011.  Two weeks later the defense would again struggle in a 45-32 loss against a Notre Dame team that was only 1-2 at the time.  After much criticism, the defense responded with their best performance of the year a week later against Virginia Tech in a 41-10 victory for the Tar Heels.  A week later, the Tar Heels claimed their fourth straight victory against Miami then later defeated their rivals Duke Blue Devils to keep the Victory Bell in Chapel Hill.  Mack Brown is 12-2 against Duke in his career.

Conference affiliations
Since starting the football program in 1888, North Carolina has been affiliated with three conferences, along with some stints an independent in the early seasons of Carolina football.

 Independent (1888–1891, 1895–1898, 1902–1921)
 SIAA (1892–1893, part of 1894, 1899–1902)
 Southern Conference (1922–1952) 	
 Atlantic Coast Conference (1953–present)

UNC was independent for most of its earliest years of college football, spending many of the seasons from 1888 to 1921 as a member of no formal athletic conference. The exceptions to this include a brief stint with the informal North Carolina Inter-Collegiate Foot-ball Association from 1888 to 1890 with Duke (then known as Trinity) and Wake Forest, and a few brief stints with the more formally recognized SIAA. The conference was formed in December 1892 when eight colleges from around the South, led by Virginia, attempted to form its first iteration; this association folded by July 1893 due to internal disputes.

Carolina tried to revive the SIAA, helping reform the association in December 1894. By January 1895, however, UNC left the SIAA, calling the venture "impracticable" due to distance considerations, in addition to the cost of associated travel expenses.

UNC's Athletic Association voted to rejoin the SIAA in 1899, becoming a member before the 1900 football season. After two more seasons in the Athletic Association, from late in 1899 to May 1902, North Carolina was suspended from the SIAA for playing two players, who were reportedly professionals, in a baseball game in 1902.

Championships

Conference championships
North Carolina claims eight conference championships with the most recent in 1980.

† Co-champions

Division championships
North Carolina won two division championships under the ACC's divisional scheduling model. Following the 2022 season, the ACC moved to a single-division format. This change makes the Tar Heels the last team to win the ACC Coastal Division in football.

Head coaches

During the years 1888, 1889 (fall schedule), and 1891–92, North Carolina had no official head coach. Over those four seasons, the team went 6–6.
In 1890, the North Carolina Tar Heels did not field a team.
On September 19, 2011, North Carolina self-imposed sanctions against its football program, including forfeiting its wins from the 2008 and 2009 seasons.
 On March 12, 2012, The NCAA Committee on Infractions stiffened the previously self-imposed sanctions including, inter alia, vacating participation in the '08 and '09 Bowl Games.

Bowl games

North Carolina has played in 36 bowl games in its history with a record of 15–21.

Rivalries

Duke

The football rivalry between Duke and North Carolina began in 1888, when Duke University was called Trinity College. Trinity won the first game in the longstanding rivalry series. While the basketball rivalry between the two teams overshadows the importance of the yearly matchup on the gridiron, the football iteration has presented its fair share of classic games. The Victory Bell was introduced for the 1948 match-up, which North Carolina won 20–0. It became tradition for the school that has possession of the bell to paint it in the shade of blue of their school. The longest consecutive win streak in the series is a 13-game streak by the Tar Heels from 1990 to 2002. Carolina officially leads the all-time series 63–41–4.

North Carolina State

The first football game between the NC State Wolfpack and the Tar Heels occurred in 1894, and the Tar Heels won 44–0. The two schools played every now and then until the formation of the ACC. Since the two teams have been a part of the ACC, they have played every year since 1953. In the past few decades, the rivalry has been more highly contested than the Tar Heels rivalry with Duke. The 1998 and 1999 games were held at Bank of America Stadium, the Tar Heels won both games. The longest consecutive win streak in the series is 9 games, from 1943 to 1955 by the Tar Heels.  

In the 112 meetings between NC State and the Tar Heels, the all-time series is 68–38–6 in favor of the Tar Heels.  Since the formation of the ACC in 1953, the Tar Heels hold the edge over the Wolfpack, 37–33, signifying the competitive nature of the rivalry.

Virginia

The Tar Heels' rivalry with the Virginia Cavaliers began in 1892, and is known as the "South's Oldest Rivalry." The teams played twice in the 1892 season, with the Cavaliers winning the first game and the Tar Heels winning the second. The two teams have played a total of 128 times, making the yearly matchup the fourth most played rivalry game among college football's major conferences. The all-time series record is 66–58–4, in favor of the Tar Heels.

Wake Forest

Wake Forest and North Carolina have met 110 times, with North Carolina holding a 72-36-2 series lead. The first game between the two teams, in 1888, was the first college football game played in the state of North Carolina. The two teams met annually from 1919 to 2004 until the ACC created the divisional format in 2005.

South Carolina

The Battle of the Carolinas is a rivalry that began in 1903. North Carolina holds a 34–20–4 overall leads the series. While no longer a conference rivalry, since South Carolina left the ACC in 1971, the teams still meet occasionally. While South Carolina was an independent (1971-1991), the teams met ten times with each team winning five.  Following South Carolina's membership in the SEC the two teams didn't meet for 16 seasons until finally meeting again in 2007 in Chapel Hill.  Since that time the two teams have played five times with South Carolina winning four.  The most recent meeting was the first postseason meeting between the two programs in the Duke's Mayo Bowl on December 30, 2021 with South Carolina winning 38-21.  The two teams are slated to meet for a fourth straight time in Charlotte on September 2, 2023.

1,000-yard rushers

Throughout the course of the Tar Heels' football history, a player has rushed for over 1,000 yards in a season 31 times. The first player to rush for over a 1,000 yards was Don McCauley, who ran for 1,092 yards in the 1969 season. The most recent Tar Heel to eclipse the 1,000 yard mark was Ty Chandler, who ran for 1,092 yards in 2021.

Notable players

All-Americans

Retired numbers

Five numbers have been retired by the university.

Notes:
  Posthumous honor after Sutherland died in a car accident.
  Barclay also served as coach in 1953–1955.

Honored jerseys
Beneath the video board in the east end zone of Kenan Stadium, several Tar Heel greats have their jersey numbers honored.

National award winners
Chuck Bednarik Award: Julius Peppers (2001)
Lombardi Award: Julius Peppers (2001)
Jim Parker Award: Landon Turner (2015)

College Football Hall of Famers

 Brown was inducted as a Texas Longhorn

Pro Football Hall of Fame

Tar Heels drafted in the NFL

Future non-conference opponents 
Announced schedules as of October 27, 2022.

Game will be played at Bank of America Stadium in Charlotte, North Carolina.

References

External links

 

 
American football teams established in 1888
Tar Heels